California Proposition 54 may refer to:

 California Proposition 54 (2003)
 California Proposition 54 (2016)